Kina (Evechinus chloroticus) is a sea urchin endemic to New Zealand. This echinoderm belongs to the family Echinometridae and it can reach a maximum diameter of 16–17 cm.

Kina have been a traditional component of Māori diet since pre-European times and has been fished commercially since 1986 in small quantities under the quota management system in restricted areas along the coast of New Zealand. Attempts to export E. chloroticus to Asian markets have been unsuccessful, so it may not be an economically attractive species for aquaculture development (James 2010).

Evechinus chloroticus is distributed throughout New Zealand and in some northern and southern offshore islands.

Habitat
This sea urchin is found all around New Zealand in shallow waters and up to 12–14 metres deep, although there are also intertidal populations in the north of both the North and South Islands.

Evechinus chloroticus prefers areas with moderate wave action. In the north of New Zealand it is found mostly on rocky seafloor areas but also in areas of sandy seafloor. In the South Island it is also found in abundant densities throughout the fiords.

Individuals smaller than 1 cm of diameter are found attached under both intertidal and subtidal rocks, whereas individuals between 1–4 cm are found in intertidal and subtidal areas under the rocks, or within small depressions in rocks. After the sea urchins reach 4 cm they migrate to open areas.

Diet
Evechinus chloroticus is mainly herbivorous, feeding on large brown algae, red algae and encrusting substrate. If kina populations become out of control, kelp forest can be entirely eaten away, leaving bare rocks, also known as Kina Barrens.

Larval stages can feed on different species of unicellular algae in a size range between 5 and 50 µm.

Predators
Molluscs such as the cymatiid gastropods Charonia capax and Charonia rubicunda, starfish, and benthic feeding fishes can feed on individuals of E. chloroticus. The most important predators are the eleven-armed sea star, Coscinasterias calamaria, the seven-armed prickly starfish Astrostole scabra, and the spiny lobster Jasus edwardsii.

Reproduction
Evechinus chloroticus has an annual breeding cycle. It becomes sexually mature between 3.5 and 7.5 cm in diameter, depending on the population. Gonads are ripe from October and individuals can spawn from November to February.

Swimming larvae complete development in the water column between 4 and 6 weeks. Other studies related to larval development report development in the laboratory can take between 22 and 30 days. The larvae of E. chloroticus are known to settle on substrates covered with coralline algal species, such as Corallina officinalis as well as artificial surfaces. High sedimentation loads in the water column, such as those associated with residential construction, have a negative effect on settling sea urchins.

Evechinus chloroticus can grow between 0.8 and 1 cm in diameter only in its first year of life, and growth rate of in wild populations has been reported between 1–2 cm in diameter annually.

Aquaculture
Sea urchin gonads are highly prized in some Asian and European seafood markets where demand has been increasing (James 2010). In the New Zealand market, the roe can reach NZ$70 per kg. However, because E. chloroticus is not well known in Japan and has a reputation for having a bitter taste, this sea urchin is unable to reach a high price in export markets (James 2010).

Despite the fact that E. chloroticus is not a profitable species for aquaculture, there are many studies on the complete culture of this species, especially relating to roe enhancement from fished sea urchins. There is strong interest in the production of good quality roe through roe enhancement, which could allow the export of them to markets such as Japan.

Roe enhancement for only nine weeks can give the greatest return for the lowest costs (feeding and maintenance). Also, it is more profitable to enhance sea urchins with low gonad index which are found in the North Island rather than the South Island.

The growth rate in juveniles of E. choloticus maintained in the laboratory is around 1 mm of diameter per month. Maturity in this species depends on the feed quality and availability rather than the sea urchin size (Barker et al.1998). Therefore, it can reach maturity as small as 30 mm if it is fed with a prepared diet (Barker et al.1998).

Artificial diets for sea urchins are well developed. However, more studies in appropriate artificial food for newly settled sea urchins are necessary as well as the design of systems for the nursery culture of post-settled sea urchins (James 2010).

Toxicology
Copper is having a detrimental effect on all stages of E. choloticus. For gametes, LOEC of >15 μg/L over one hour. For pluteus stage, LOEC of 10.4 μg/L over 4 days. For adults, LOEC of 50 μg/L over 2 weeks.

References

• Barker MF, Keogh JA, Lawrence JM and Lawrence AL. 1998. Feeding rate, absorption efficiencies, growth, and enhancement of gonad production in the New Zealand sea urchin Evechinus chloroticus Valenciennes (Echinoidea: Echinometridae) fed prepared and natural diets. Journal of Shellfish Research 17: 1583–1590.

• James P. 2010. Sea urchins: opportunities and lessons. New Zealand Aquaculture 36 (July/August): 12–13.

External links

 'Sea Urchins', from An Encyclopaedia of New Zealand, edited by A. H. McLintock, originally published in 1966.

Echinometridae
Commercial echinoderms
Echinoderms of New Zealand
Animals described in 1846
New Zealand seafood
Māori cuisine